Yolanda de Ataliba Nogueira Penteado (1903-1983) was a Brazilian patron of the arts and member of an affluent coffee ranching family with artistic connections. Her aunt was Olívia Guedes Penteado and she was married to Ciccillo Matarazzo.

References 

Brazilian feminists
Brazilian patrons of the arts
Museum founders
1903 births
1983 deaths
20th-century philanthropists
20th-century women philanthropists